Josef Kien (born 25 November 1951) is an Austrian diver. He competed in the men's 3 metre springboard event at the 1972 Summer Olympics.

References

1951 births
Living people
Austrian male divers
Olympic divers of Austria
Divers at the 1972 Summer Olympics
Place of birth missing (living people)